Margaritovka is a rural locality (a selo) in Margaritovsky Selsoviet of Mazanovsky District, Amur Oblast, Russia. The population was 329 as of 2018. There are 15 streets.

Geography 
Margaritovka is located 67 km southeast of Novokiyevsky Uval (the district's administrative centre) by road. Pautovka is the nearest rural locality.

References 

Rural localities in Mazanovsky District